Teesra Kaun is a 1994 Hindi language comedy action thriller film directed by Partho Ghosh.
It features Chunky Pandey, Mithun Chakraborty, Amol Palekar, Satish Shah, Rakesh Bedi. The film is a remake of the 1990 Malayalam film No.20 Madras Mail, directed by Joshiy and starring Mohanlal in the lead role.

Plot 
The story revolves around a train journey in Howrah-Bombay Mail. Three Bollywood-stricken, Nagpur-based slackers, Vijay Verma, Bingo Nagpurkar and Khoka Ganguli board the Howrah-Bombay Mail, to head to Bombay to watch a cricket match, and to meet Bollywood actor Mithun Chakraborty.

During this trip, they drink a lot of alcohol. Vijay notices that the people in the next room in his train coach are a couple with an attractive young woman. He goes over to introduce himself, and finds that the man calls himself Mr. D.K. Kadam (Amol palekar), and the young woman's name is Manjula. Vijay wants to change his seat, so that he can be near Manjula, but unfortunately that seat is taken up by a young man, Pankaj Nigam. Vijay attempts to forcibly take the seat from Pankaj, and a fight ensues, and Vijay is asked to leave them alone. During a stopover, Pankaj leaves the train, and when the train starts, Mr. Kadam finds that Manjula has been killed.

The police begin their investigation, and they have two suspects, namely, Pankaj Nigam and Vijay Verma. They also find out that Pankaj is not who he claims to be, and that his real name is Sanjay Chopra. Further investigations prove that neither Vijay nor Pankaj could have possibly murdered Aisha Manjula, leaving the police, Vijay and his friends on one hand, and Sanjay Chopra, to hunt for the third suspect (i.e. Teesra Kaun?), the one who actually killed Manjula, and the one who may also kill anyone who stands in his/her way. Further, Mithun helps his all fans in every way. After a huge fight it is revealed that the man who was pretending to be the father of Manjula was murderer of Manjula's father and he blackmailed them always. Finally on confrontation with Mithun, Pankaj and Vijay, Dr. Kadam confesses that he was the actual murderer of Manjula. In the last scene Manjula's mother shoots him on station while the police inspector was about to arrest Dr. Kadam

Cast
 Chunky Pandey as Vijay Verma
 Mithun Chakraborty as himself
 Amol Palekar as C. K. Kadam
 Rituparna Sengupta as Manjula Saxena 
 Javed Jaffrey as Pankaj Nigam / Sanjay Chopra
 Somy Ali as Priyanka
 Satish Shah as Bhring Nagpurkar 
 Rakesh Bedi as Khoka Ganguli
 Sadashiv Amrapurkar as Inspector Aditya Talwar
 Tinnu Anand as P. K. Rasiya
 Avtar Gill as Rana Saxena
 Himani Shivpuri as Shanti Verma
 Beena Banerjee as Manjula's mother (as Beena)
 K.D. Chandran as Mr. Verma
 Sheeba Akashdeep as self, in song Teesra Kaun
 Gautami as herself (guest appearance)
 Anil Dhawan as Anil Saxena (special appearance)
 Shashi Kiran as Film producer
 K.K Raj as waiter in train
 Ramesh Goyal as coolie on Akola station

Songs
"Teesra Kaun" – Abhijeet Bhattacharya, Poornima
"Theme of Teesra Kaun?" - N/A
"Jab Maine Tera Naam Liya" - Udit Narayan, Bela Sulakhe 
"Kya Aankhen Hai" – Abhijeet Bhattacharya, Alka Yagnik
"Dekha Tujhe To Dil Gaane Laga" – Bali Brahmbhatt, Suneeta Rao 
"Band Baajega" – Udit Narayan, Bela Sulakhe
"Humein Tumse Pyar Tha" – Abhijeet Bhattacharya, Sadhana Sargam
"Love In Rain" – Kumar Sanu, Poornima

Trivia
The 8002 Howrah Bombay mail is shown running with different locomotive engines in different scenes.

The star cast boards the train's 1st class compartment and say that it is air conditioned coach. However, in next scenes you can see that all windows are open and it is not a A/C coach.

References

External links
 

1994 films
1990s Hindi-language films
Films scored by Anand–Milind
Indian detective films
Mithun's Dream Factory films
Films shot in Ooty
Hindi remakes of Malayalam films
Films directed by Partho Ghosh